Lord Duncan was a slave ship whose origins are obscure. She made one voyage in 1798–1799 in the triangular trade in enslaved people. She was condemned at Jamaica in 1800 after having delivered her captives.

Captain John Hodgson sailed from Liverpool on 5 December 1798, bound for the Bight of Benin. She arrived at Kingston on 20 November 1799 with 194 captives. Captain Hodgson died on 11 December. Captain Alexander Cowan replaced him. Lord Duncan had left Liverpool with 21 crew members and had suffered two crew deaths on her voyage.

Lord Duncan sailed from Jamaica, bound for Liverpool, but had to put back and was condemned.

Citations

References

1790s ships
Liverpool slave ships